Eric Hipwood (born 13 September 1997) is a professional Australian rules footballer playing for the Brisbane Lions in the Australian Football League (AFL).

Early life
Hipwood was born in Melbourne's inner suburb of St Kilda. His parents were passionate St Kilda Saints fans who had married in the stands of Moorabbin Oval prior to his birth. His grandfather, Ken, was instrumental in establishing the Aspley Football Club in Brisbane's northern suburbs and his father, Brad, was a former senior player for Aspley. His grandparents are also life members of the Aspley Football Club. At the age of three, Eric moved to his father's home state of Queensland and settled on the Sunshine Coast with his family where he began playing junior football for Kawana Park at the age of eight. 

At 13 years of age he was placed in the Brisbane Lions developmental academy and switched allegiances to the Caloundra Australian Football Club. Two years later, at the age of 15, he played his first QFA senior match for Caloundra in their away clash against Aspley and kicked three goals on debut. In his final year of junior football he switched clubs again and played for Aspley in the North East Australian Football League (NEAFL). Hipwood was selected to represent Queensland at the 2015 AFL Under 18 Championships and was named in the All Australian team for his performances. He was then invited to attend the AFL Draft Combine in November 2015.

Hipwood was also a very talented cricketer in his younger years and accepted an invitation to join the cricket sports excellence program at Maroochydore State High School in Year 10.

AFL career
He made his AFL debut in the forty-nine point loss against  at the Gabba in round 13 of the 2016 season.

2018

Hipwood played all 22 matches of the 2018 season. With 37 goals, he was Brisbane's leading goalkicker for the year. In round 16, Hipwood kicked 6 goals in Brisbane's win against Carlton. Hipwood received three Brownlow Medal votes in both this game and the round 9 win against Hawthorn.

2019

2019 saw Hipwood play 23 games including finals with 35 goals kicked for the year. He signed a contract extension, keeping him at Brisbane until at least the end of 2023.

Statistics
Updated to the end of the 2022 season.

|-
| 2016 ||  || 30
| 10 || 11 || 16 || 60 || 35 || 95 || 30 || 11 || 1.1 || 1.6 || 6.0 || 3.5 || 9.5 || 3.0 || 1.1 || 0
|-
| 2017 ||  || 30
| 20 || 30 || 16 || 124 || 48 || 172 || 59 || 25 || 1.5 || 0.8 || 6.2 || 2.4 || 8.6 || 3.0 || 1.3 || 2
|-
| 2018 ||  || 30
| 22 || 37 || 27 || 133 || 47 || 233 || 93 || 24 || 1.9 || 1.2 || 8.3 || 2.9 || 11.2 || 3.9 || 0.9 || 6
|-
| 2019 ||  || 30
| 23 || 35 || 29 || 182 || 51 || 233 || 107 || 42 || 1.5 || 1.3 || 7.9 || 2.2 || 10.1 || 4.7 || 1.8 || 6
|-
| 2020 ||  || 30
| 19 || 24 || 19 || 147 || 40 || 187 || 79 || 17 || 1.3 || 1.0 || 7.7 || 2.1 || 9.8 || 4.2 || 0.9 || 1
|-
| 2021 ||  || 30
| 16 || 26 || 20 || 118 || 51 || 169 || 79 || 20 || 1.6 || 1.3 || 7.4 || 3.2 || 10.6 || 4.9 || 1.3 || 1
|-
| 2022 ||  || 30
| 17 || 25 || 17 || 125 || 49 || 174 || 79 || 18 || 1.5 || 1.0 || 7.4 || 2.9 || 10.2 || 4.6 || 1.1 || 0
|- class=sortbottom
! colspan=3 | Career
! 127 !! 188 !! 144 !! 932 !! 331 !! 1263 !! 526 !! 157 !! 1.5 !! 1.1 !! 7.3 !! 2.6 !! 9.9 !! 4.1 !! 1.2 !! 16
|}

Notes

Honours and achievements
Individual
 Brisbane Lions leading goalkicker: 2018 (37)
 3× 22under22 team: 2017, 2018, 2019
 AFL Rising Star nominee: 2017 (round 5)

References

External links 

1997 births
Living people
Brisbane Lions players
Aspley Football Club players
Sportspeople from the Sunshine Coast
Australian rules footballers from Queensland
People from St Kilda, Victoria